Garhi Udairaj is a village located in the Fatehabad block of the Agra District in Uttar Pradesh.

References

Villages in Agra district